Bogan (also Romanized as Bog‘ān; also known as Began) is a village in Bani Saleh Rural District, Neysan District, Hoveyzeh County, Khuzestan Province, Iran. At the 2006 census, its population was 114, in 15 families.

References 

Populated places in Hoveyzeh County